The Lady Is A Cat is the first album by American band Antioch Arrow, which was released in 1993 through Gravity Records on 12" vinyl. The record was packaged in spray-painted chipboard sleeves, and the cover design was lifted from the poster for the 1955 film The Man with the Golden Arm. Although primarily pressed on black vinyl, rare translucent red copies were also pressed and released secretly. The total number of these copies is unknown.

The album is characterized by its hardcore-rooted sound that is "simple" compared to the recordings the band would later release. The record is currently in print and can be purchased still from Gravity Records. The record, in its entirety, was also released on the band's self-titled 1997 compilation album, which is also still in print.

Track listing

Personnel 
Aaron Montaigne – vocals
Aaron Ricards – guitar
Jeff Winterberg – guitar
Mac Mann – bass
Ron Avila – drums
Matt Anderson – recording

References 

1993 albums
Antioch Arrow albums